Anna Goulding is a New Zealand ice hockey defender, who played for Leksands IF in the SDHL and served as captain for the New Zealand national team. She was drafted 73rd overall in the 2017 CWHL Draft, after having trained at York University in Canada and having made her national team debut in 2008.

References

External links
 

1992 births
Living people
Leksands IF players